Kyren Wilson (born 23 December 1991) is an English professional snooker player from Kettering and a five-time ranking event winner. He has been a runner-up at two of the three Triple Crown events, having reached the final at the 2018 Masters and the 2020 World Snooker Championship. Wilson reached his highest world ranking of fourth in 2020. A prolific breakbuilder, he has made over 350 century breaks and three maximum breaks.

Wilson turned professional in 2010 after finishing fifth in the 2009–2010 International Open Series rankings. After failing to retain his spot on the World Snooker Tour in 2011, he regained his tour card in 2013 and has been a professional ever since. Wilson won his first ranking title at the 2015 Shanghai Masters when ranked 54th in the world; he defeated Judd Trump 10–9 in the final. Wilson has won an additional four ranking events: at the 2018 Paul Hunter Classic, defeating Peter Ebdon 4–2; at the 2019 German Masters, defeating David Gilbert 9–7; at the 2020 Championship League, again defeating Trump, this time by a score of 3–1. and at the 2022 European Masters, defeating Barry Hawkins 9-3.

Career

Early career (2009–13)
During the 2009–10 season, Wilson won the sixth event of the International Open Series having already finished runner-up in the third event, where finished the season fifth in the rankings. This gave Wilson a place on the World Snooker Tour for the 2010–11 snooker season. In the UK Championship he defeated Paul Davison 9–6 and Ian McCulloch 9–8, before losing 4–9 to Rory McLeod in the third round. He reached the same stage of the World Championship qualifying with defeats of Dermot McGlinchey and Joe Swail, before McLeod once again conquered Wilson this time 10–3 in the third round of qualifying. He finished the year ranked world number 72 and did not retain his place on tour. Wilson entered Q School to win back his place on Tour, but was unable to do so.

Having dropped off the Tour, Wilson was considered an amateur player and could not enter qualifying for any of the ranking events. He entered 12 of the Players Tour Championship (PTC) events and finished 72nd on the Order of Merit. He once again entered Q School but only won one match over three events. In the 2012–13 season, Wilson was again confined to entering amateur events and enjoyed a good run in the PTC Event 4 by beating Tom Ford, Jamie Jones and Stephen Maguire, before being whitewashed 4–0 by Ding Junhui in the last 16. He also lost in the last 32 in two European Tour events to be ranked 75th on the PTC Order of Merit. He then turned professional in 2013 for the 2013–14 season.

2013–2014 season
Wilson enjoyed a successful return to the professional game during the 2013/2014 season. He won four matches in Shanghai Masters qualifying, concluding with a 5–3 victory over Marcus Campbell to reach the main stage of a ranking event for the first time. In his first round match against Stuart Bingham, Wilson had a chance to make a 147 but missed the 13th black. Nevertheless, he defeated his much higher ranked opponent 5–1 and continued his run with a 5–3 win over Marco Fu. Wilson's tournament came to an end in the quarter-finals as he lost 1–5 against Michael Holt. He caused another upset in the first round of the International Championship by beating Stephen Maguire 6–3, before losing 1–6 to Graeme Dott in the second round. He also qualified for the China Open, but was eliminated 5–3 by Jamie O'Neill in the opening round.

In World Championship qualifying, Wilson beat Chris Norbury 10–6 and then defeated Alfie Burden and Rod Lawler, both by 10–3 score lines, to stand just one win away from making his first appearance at the main stage of the tournament. In the fourth qualifying round, he faced the 2006 winner of the event Graeme Dott and came back from 1–4 down to trail only 4–5 at the end of the first session. His momentum continued into the evening and he took the last four frames of the match, including three breaks over 50, to win 10–7. In anticipation of playing his first match at the Crucible, Wilson described it as a "dream come true" and said that he would like to draw Ronnie O'Sullivan in the first round. Dott stated that Wilson could "beat anybody" if he played to the same standard again. Wilson played world number 12 Ricky Walden in the first round of the championship, losing 7–10 after a final frame that lasted for over an hour.

2014–2015 season

Wilson failed to qualify for the first three ranking events of the 2014–15 season, before beating Ross Muir to play in the first round of the International Championship where he lost 2–6 to Sam Baird. After edging Gary Wilson 6–5 in the first round of the UK Championship, Wilson stated that his concentration had been fading in matches this season and would have to raise his game significantly against defending champion Neil Robertson. He did exactly that as he made an 87 break to lead 5–4 and had a chance to win in the next frame courtesy of a fluked red, but lost position on the final brown allowing Robertson to level. In the decider Wilson missed a tough opening red and Robertson responded with a match winning 86.

After losing in the semi-finals of the 2015 Snooker Shoot-Out, Wilson had his best finish of the year in a ranking event as he dropped just one frame in beating Alan McManus and Ben Woollaston at the Indian Open. In the next round, he was defeated 3–4 by Joe Perry. Wilson ended the season as world number 56.

2015–2016 season

Wilson won three matches to qualify for the 2015 Shanghai Masters and came through a wildcard round match in China, before beating Joe Perry 5–2 and Michael Holt 5–1. In Wilson's second career ranking event quarter-final he led home favourite Ding Junhui 3–1, before Ding levelled at 3–3. The match went to a deciding frame, which Wilson won on the final black. Wilson then dominated Mark Allen 6–1 to reach his first ranking final, where his match with Judd Trump went to a deciding frame, after Wilson had led 7–3, 8–4 and 9–7. In the decider, Wilson made a championship winning 75 break to claim his first ranking title. Ranked world number 54, Wilson become the lowest ranked player to win a ranking title since 2005, however he rose to 22nd after the event.

After the Shanghai success, Wilson lost in the last 32 of the two next ranking events: 3–6 to Mark Allen at the International Championship and 1–6 to Tom Ford at the UK Championship. At the German Masters, after beating Rory McLeod, Michael Holt and Ryan Day, all by 5–4 scorelines, he reached the semi-finals, but was defeated 6–3 by Luca Brecel, who became the first Belgian player to reach the final of a ranking event.

Along with Anthony Hamilton at the China Open qualifiers, Wilson set a new record of six consecutive centuries in a snooker match, four of which were scored by him. In the first round of the Welsh Open, Wilson lost 3–4 to Irish player Leo Fernandez. He finished fourth on the World Grand Prix Order of Merit, and at the event he lost 1–4 to Joe Perry in the last 16. At the China Open he was knocked out 5–1 in the second round by Rod Lawler. Wilson came through World Championship qualifying and then edged out Joe Perry 10–9 in the opening round. In the second round he took a 7–1 lead over Mark Allen after the first session and also led 11–5, before Allen won four frames in a row. Wilson then took the two frames he needed to reach the quarter-finals and made the tournament's high break of 143 against Mark Selby, but lost 8–13. His ended the year at 16th in the world rankings.

2016–2017 season
Wilson recovered from 0–3 down to Xiao Guodong in the second round of the Indian Open to win 4–3 and would go on to play in the final after eliminating Nigel Bond 4–1 in the semi-finals. He faced Anthony McGill and was tied at 2–2 at the interval, but McGill pulled away to triumph 5–2. In the fourth round of the Northern Ireland Open, Wilson was 3–0 up before his opponent Ronnie O'Sullivan restricted him to one pot as he levelled with three successive centuries. Wilson held his nerve to win 4–3 and then beat Mark Williams 5–4. In the semi-finals he lost 2–6 to Mark King. Wilson played in the Masters for the first time and was eliminated 6–3 by Ding Junhui.

Wilson overcame Ding 5–1 in the quarter-finals of the China Open, but never got ahead of Mark Selby in a 6–4 semi-final defeat. Wilson was a seeded player at the World Championship for the first time and battled past David Grace 10–6 in the opening round. He had a great start against Stuart Bingham in round two as he won the first five frames and he went on to reach the quarter-finals of the event for the second year in a row with a 13–10 win. The tip of Wilson's cue split at 3–3 and John Higgins would progress 13–6.

2017–2018 season
Wilson made his first official maximum break against Martin Gould in the second round of the International Championship, but eventually lost 5–6.
 In January 2018, Wilson reached the final of the Masters, becoming the first person born in the 1990s to appear in any Triple Crown final. He was beaten by Mark Allen in a close match. Wilson also reached two ranking finals that season, losing to Ding Junhui and Ronnie O'Sullivan. At the World Championship as he reached the semi-finals (beating Allen 13–6 in the last eight) before losing 13–17 to John Higgins. Wilson made a 140 break in frame seven, after which the match was delayed for a time when he suffered a nosebleed.

2018–2019 season

In August 2018, Wilson claimed his second ranking event title at the Paul Hunter Classic, defeating 2002 World Champion Peter Ebdon 4–2 in the final. In September, he won his second consecutive tournament, the non-ranking Six-red World Championship, defeating Ding Junhui in the final 8–4. He then reached the semi-finals of the Shanghai Masters where, after tying the match at 6–6, he lost 6–10 to defending and eventual champion Ronnie O'Sullivan.

At the Champion of Champions tournament in November, Wilson beat world champion Mark Williams and Judd Trump by dropping only a frame in each match, before defeating Masters champion Mark Allen, to face Ronnie O'Sullivan in the final. O'Sullivan led 5–1 and 8–5, but Wilson pulled back to lead 9–8 before eventually losing 9–10. In the Northern Ireland Open, Wilson played a seven-frame match that lasted over three hours, against Lee Walker (whose average shot time was 38 seconds), losing 3–4 in the deciding frame. He then reached the quarter-final stage of the UK Championship, losing 1–6 to Stuart Bingham.

He won the German Masters in February 2019, beating David Gilbert 9–7 in the final. Having trailed 5–7, Wilson recovered to win the last four frames of the match for his third ranking title. He made quarter-final appearances at three further ranking events before the end of the season, at the World Grand Prix, the Tour Championship, and the World Championship.

2019–2020 season
Defending his title at the Paul Hunter Classic in August 2019, Wilson finished runner-up after a 3–4 defeat to Barry Hawkins in the final. Leading the match 3–2 and needing only a couple of pots to retain the title, Wilson broke down on 57, allowing Hawkins to force a deciding frame which he won. At the quarter-final stage of the Shanghai Masters in September, Wilson led 5–1 against defending champion Ronnie O'Sullivan and was just one frame away from progressing to the next round, but then lost five straight frames and the match 5–6. He reached the semi-finals of the World Open in October, losing 5–6 to Thepchaiya Un-Nooh.

After losing to Stuart Bingham in the quarter-finals of the 2020 Masters, where he led 4–1 before being defeated 4–6, Wilson beat defending champion Judd Trump 4–3 in the second round of the World Grand Prix in February 2020; he then defeated John Higgins in the quarter-finals 5–4, before being knocked out in the semi-finals by Neil Robertson 4–6. The following week, he reached the final of the Welsh Open; despite inflicting a 5–0 quarter-final whitewash on defending champion Neil Robertson, and making his second competitive 147 along the way, he was heavily defeated in the final by Shaun Murphy 9–1. He was runner-up at the 2020 Gibraltar Open in March; after defeating Thepchaiya Un-Nooh and Mark Williams, both 4–0, en route to the final, he missed out on the title with a 3–4 defeat to Judd Trump.

The 2020 World Snooker Championship was delayed due to the COVID-19 pandemic and Wilson received a bye for the first round due to Anthony Hamilton withdrawing from the tournament. Wilson defeated Martin Gould in the second round, defending champion Judd Trump in the quarter-final, before defeating Anthony McGill 17–16 after fluking a match winning  in the semi-final. During the semi-final in victory he was visibly emotional and later apologised having won the match on a fluke.

He played Ronnie O'Sullivan in the final. The first session was of poor standard perhaps due to both players reeling from narrow victories in their semi-finals, both won on deciding frames. Wilson trailed 6–2 after the first session but found form in the second whereas O'Sullivan lost his, first leading 8–2 but then losing his lead to 9–7. The day ended with O'Sullivan leading 10–7, with Wilson missing a crucial red in frame 17 along the cushion that would have probably led to him winning the frame. In the third session Wilson started strongly with a break of 73 but then lost eight successive frames and lost the final 18–8.

2020–2021 season
Kyren started new season as a world number 6. At the European Masters, he got through first rounds to play against Judd Trump in quarter-final stage. In this best-of-9 match, Trump won first 4 frames, then Kyren halved the deficit to 2–4, but Trump's century in seventh frame meant the end at the tournament for the Warrior.  These two met again a few weeks later, at the 2020 English Open, also in the quarter-final. Even in this match, Kyren fell short and finally lost 1–5 to eventual champion Trump.

At 2020 Championship league, which was a ranking tournament for the first time in this season, Kyren topped all three group stages to reach his 10th ranking final. He played against world number one Judd Trump for the third time in just few weeks. In this best-of-five match, Warrior claimed first frame, but Trump responded with a break 118 to level. Then Kyren regained the lead and finally won the match 3-1 by playing break of 88 in 4th frame to claim his 4th ranking event victory.

Personal life
Wilson has two sons and has stated that he wants to win titles to make them proud. He supports Chelsea.

Performance and rankings timeline

Career finals

Ranking finals: 12 (5 titles)

Non-ranking finals: 6 (3 titles)

Amateur finals: 2 (1 title)

References

External links

 Kyren Wilson at the World Snooker Tour
 Global Snooker Profile (as of 2010)
 

1991 births
Living people
English snooker players
Sportspeople from Kettering
World Games gold medalists
Competitors at the 2017 World Games